Owusu-Ankomah (born 1956 in Sekondi) is a leading contemporary African artist with origins in Ghana. His work addresses themes of identity and the body, using his trademark motif of Adinkra symbolism. His work is also "influenced by the art of the Renaissance, handwritten texts from ancient cultures such as the adinkra symbol system of the Akan people of Ghana, Chinese ideograms, and contemporary global cultures." Owusu-Ankomah is a trained artist from Achimota college, near Accra, "established in 1936 and in 1952 incorporated into the University of Science and Technology at Kumasi."

Early life and education
Owusu-Ankomah was born in 1956 in Sekondi, Ghana. Between 1971 and 1974 he studied at the Ghanatta College of Art in Accra, Ghana.

Career 
Beginning in 1979 he embarked on a series of journeys to Europe, making contact with European artists and galleries. Since 1986, Owusu-Ankomah has lived in the city of Bremen in Germany. Owusu-Ankomah is also recognized as an expatriated artist due to his journey to Germany.

The Asanteman system of adinkra signs provides recurring motifs for the artist's large canvases. He re-interprets their symbolism in the context of gallery art, while retaining much of their original meaning. Owusu-Ankomah's recent paintings deal with scientific, technological, metaphysical and spiritual facts and truths. The evolution of the human, consciousness, the nonlocality of the soul and its eternal progression. He believes emphatically that there has been other ancient highly advanced civilizations before Egypt who were adepts in sacred geometry which he uses in his work. He has recognized and presented in his latest works more crop circles, his way of bearing witness to the truth underlying the fact that we are not alone in the universe, that we have been visited and are still being visited. Between 2004 and 2008 he cultivated the lifestyle of a hermit, reflecting, meditating and researching, coining the word Microcron. He had discovered, as he has said and says, the ultimate symbol, the symbol of symbols, with its accompanying theory and philosophy that he also calls the Microcron.

Looking at some of "his strongest pieces, which have historically been black-and-white, he pushes the relationship between the figures and the symbols further. He also uses two figures rather than one, generating a sense of energy and depth. But some recent paintings included in this exhibition (MICROCRON BEGINS) show a dramatic shift into color, an emphasis on tone rather than line, and a more hierarchical composition. These works seem transitional, as if he is feeling his way toward pieces that are more spacious, sparse, and potentially introspective. Now that he is in his fifties, there is a synthesis in his thought that is looking for new outlets in his visual work. But one hopes he won’t leave the linear strength and dynamism of his black-and-white compositions behind."

Owusu-Ankomah has exhibited throughout Germany as well as internationally in Britain and the US, Europe, South Africa, South America and Asia.

References

Private collections
Prince Olivier Doria d'Angri
Michele Faissola (Deutsche Bank), Sammlung Kalkmann - Bodenburg (Germany)

External links
 Online Artwork

1956 births
Living people
German artists
Ghanaian artists
German contemporary artists
20th-century Ghanaian painters
20th-century male artists
Male painters
Ghanaian male artists